A vestigial twin is a form of parasitic twinning, where the parasitic "twin" is so malformed and incomplete that it typically consists entirely of extra limbs or organs. It also can be a complete living being trapped inside the host person, however the parasitic twin is anencephalic and lacks consciousness.

This phenomenon occurs when a fertilized ovum or partially formed embryo splits incompletely. The result can be anything from two whole people joined by a bit of skin (conjoined twins), to one person with extra body parts belonging to the vestigial twin.

Most vestigial limbs are non-functional, and although they may have bones, muscles and nerve endings, they are not under the control of the host. The possession of six or more digits on the hands and feet (polydactyly) usually has a genetic or chromosomal cause, and is not a case of vestigial twinning.

References

Congenital disorders
Parasitic twin
Rare diseases